The East Allegheny School District is a small, suburban, public school district covering the Boroughs of East McKeesport, Wall and Wilmerding and North Versailles Township in Allegheny County, Pennsylvania. According to 2000 federal census data, it served a resident population of 16,340. By 2010, the district's population declined to 15,128 people. In 2009, the residents' per capita income was $16,497, while the median family income was $37,169. In the Commonwealth, the median family income was $49,501  and the United States median family income was $49,445, in 2010.

East Allegheny School District operates East Allegheny High School (9th-12th), East Allegheny Junior High (7th-8th ), and Logan Elementary (K-6th). The District is one of the 500 public school districts of Pennsylvania.

Extracurriculars
East Allegheny School District offers a variety of clubs, activities, and an extensive sports program.

Sports
High School Varsity

Boys
Baseball - AA
Basketball - AAA
Bowling - AAAA
Football - AA
Golf - AA
Soccer - AA
Swimming and Diving - AA
Track and Field - AA

Girls
Basketball - AA
Bowling AAAA
Soccer (Fall) AA
Softball - AA
Swimming and Diving AA
Track and Field  AA
Volleyball - AA

Middle School:

Boys
Basketball
Football
Soccer
Track and Field

Girls
Basketball
Soccer (Fall)
Softball
Track and Field
Volleyball

According to PIAA directory July 2012

References

School districts in Allegheny County, Pennsylvania
Education in Pittsburgh area
School districts established in 1969